Starý Hrozenkov is a municipality and village in Uherské Hradiště District in the Zlín Region of the Czech Republic. It has about 800 inhabitants.

Twin towns – sister cities

Starý Hrozenkov is twinned with:
 Darłowo, Poland

References

Villages in Uherské Hradiště District